Lincoln Bancroft (June 30, 1877 – July 16, 1942) was an American businessman and politician.

Biography
Born in Johnstown, Cumberland County, Illinois, Bancroft studied law in Greenup, Illinois. He was in the real estate and oil business. He served as mayor of Greenup, Illinois and was a Republican. He served in the Illinois House of Representatives from 1917 to 1929.

Bancroft died in an automobile accident near Effingham, Illinois when his automobile crashed into a bridge on United States Route 45.

References

External links

1877 births
1932 deaths
People from Greenup, Illinois
Businesspeople from Illinois
Mayors of places in Illinois
Republican Party members of the Illinois House of Representatives
Road incident deaths in Illinois